Chandra Muzaffar is a Malaysian political scientist, and an Islamic reformist and activist. He has written on civilization dialogue, human rights, Malaysian politics and international relations.

Career
Muzaffar was the first Director of the Centre for Civilisational Dialogue at the University of Malaya, in Kuala Lumpur. He then became the Noordin Sopiee Professor of Global Studies at the University of Science (USM) in Penang.

From 1977 to 1991, he founded Aliran Kesedaran Negara (Aliran); a multi-ethnic reform group in Malaysia for justice, freedom and solidarity. He later became the president of the International Movement for a Just World (JUST), a non-governmental organization (NGO) that aims to raise public consciousness on the moral and intellectual basis of global justice.

Works
 Protector (1979)
 Universalism of Islam (1979)
 Islamic Resurgence in Malaysia (1987)
 Human Rights and the New World Order (1993)
 Alternative Politics for Asia: A Buddhist-Muslim Dialogue (1999)
 Rights, Religion and Reform (2002)
 Global Ethic or Global Hegemony? (2005)
 Hegemony:  Justice;  Peace (2008)
 Religion & Governance (2009)
 Politics in Asia: A Buddhist-Muslim Dialogue

Election results

References

External links
 "Muzaffar, Chandra" in Oxford Islamic Studies Online
 International Movement for a Just World

Living people
Muslim reformers
Malaysian writers
English-language writers from Malaysia
1947 births